Borgå Akilles, or more commonly just Akilles, is a Finnish sports club from the city of Porvoo. Akilles, named for Achilles in ancient Greek mythology, was founded in 1902 and is one of the oldest active football clubs in Finland.

In Finland the club is mostly known for bandy. It plays in the highest division, Bandyliiga. It became Finnish champions in 1981, 1985, 2020 and 2021 and won the Finnish Cup in 2019.

The football team won promotion to the Finnish Third Division in 2006. The club also has active sections in cycling, track and field, handball, orienteering, skiing, and fitness sport.

Results in football 

13 seasons in Suomensarja
20 seasons in II Divisioona
30 seasons in Kolmonen
11 seasons in Nelonen
4 seasons in Vitonen
1 season in Kutonen

References

Official homepage 
 Borgå Akilles official website 
 Borgå Akilles history 

 
Bandy clubs in Finland
Football clubs in Finland
Orienteering clubs in Finland
Bandy clubs established in 1902
Association football clubs established in 1902
1902 establishments in Finland
Sport in Porvoo